Carman is a goddess in Irish mythology.

Carman may also refer to:

Places
 Carman, Manitoba, a town in Canada
 Carman (electoral district), in the Canadian province of Manitoba
 Carman, Illinois, a town in the United States
 Carman Township, Henderson County, Illinois, a township based around Carman, Illinois

Transportation
 Carman (South) Airport, an airport near Carman, Manitoba
 Carman/Friendship Field Airport, an airport near Carman, Manitoba
 Carman Subdivision, a railroad line in New York
 Carman, a driver of a heavy horse-drawn vehicle or early motorised heavy goods vehicle

Other uses
 Carman (surname)
 Carman (singer) (1956–2021), American Christian singer
 Car-Man, a Russian pop band

See also
Carmen (disambiguation)
Carmin (disambiguation)
Cartman (disambiguation)